T. terrae may refer to:

Terrabacter terrae, a Gram-positive bacterium
Terrimonas terrae, a Gram-negative bacterium